Calycella is a genus of hydrozoans belonging to the family Campanulinidae.

Species:

Calycella gracilis 
Calycella syringa

References

Campanulinidae
Hydrozoan genera